Independent Civic Movement (in Spanish: Movimiento Cívico Independiente) was a political party in Peru.  Its founders included edro Beltrán, Javier Ortiz de Zevallos and Pedro Roselló.

Defunct political parties in Peru
Political parties with year of disestablishment missing